Wheelock House is a commercial office building located on Pedder Street in Central, Hong Kong. Wheelock House is a Class A office space completed in 1984 and has 24 storeys. One of its architects was Wong & Ouyang (HK) Ltd while the real estate developer was Cheung Kong Holdings.

History
Wheelock House was built on the site where once stood three previous generations of Jardine House, the headquarters of Jardine, Matheson & Co. The first Jardine House was probably built around 1841 after Jardine's successful bid for its lots on The Praya Central. In 1908, the second Jardine House was built. It was rebuilt in around 1956, and redeveloped in the early 1970s as Wheelock House.

Nearby
 World-Wide House
 The Landmark
 Island line (MTR), Central station (MTR)
 Queen's Road Central
 Lan Kwai Fong

References

External links

 List of Wang & Ouyang (HK) Co's building works
 Map of the Wheelock House, Central

Central, Hong Kong
Office buildings in Hong Kong
Wheelock and Company